The Osceola County School for the Arts (OCSA) is a public magnet arts school located in Kissimmee, Florida. Students can major in one of the following disciplines: Visual Arts, Drama, Vocal Music, Instrumental Music/Band, Creative Writing, Dance, Orchestra, or Technical Theater. Middle school students (grades sixth, seventh, and eighth) may major in any discipline except Technical Theater.

OCSA enrolls students in grades 6–12 and is part of the School District of Osceola County. The school serves Osceola County, and enrolled 936 students as of the 2018–2019 school year.

History 

In an effort to expand the arts program in Osceola County, and prepare students for work in the entertainment industry offered by theme parks and production studios in Central Florida, the School District of Osceola County considered using $6.5 million to build small 600- to 700-seat theaters at Saint Cloud High School, Poinciana High School, and Osceola High School; however, the cost of building the three theaters was estimated at $19.5 million. Only a day after the meeting in August 2001, Tupperware announced that it would be selling part of its world headquarters located on Orange Blossom Trail. The 2,100-seat auditorium on the property was three times larger than any theater the district could build. The plastics company held the property off the market for six months while in negotiations with the School District of Osceola County before the school board members came to a decision. In February 2002, the Osceola County School Board voted to purchase the convention center complex for $6.5 million. The board intended to convert the facility into a Performing Arts middle/high school (6-12) open to students residing in Osceola County. But since 2016, the school has decided to invite students from Orange, Seminole, and Polk counties to apply and audition. The School District of Osceola County decided to build three black box theaters at the three high schools in need of theaters, which would only cost the district $4.5 million.

It was proposed to call the new school "Walter Disney Memorial School for the Arts" to capitalize on the draw of the name, but questions regarding policy for naming schools after people persuaded the school board to reject the proposal. The school board settled on the district's school naming committee's suggestion of "The Osceola County School for the Arts," and named the 2,100-seat theater "The Osceola Performing Arts Center (OPAC)".

In 2004, the Florida Department of Transportation approved the installation of a traffic light to be placed at the intersection of the school's entrance and the highway. The Osceola County School Board paid more than $50,000 for a temporary signal to be placed at the intersection for two years.

Renovations on campus began in July 2007 at the Osceola County School for the Arts and the Osceola Performing Arts Center and its Expo Hall, and ended in mid-2008. Remodeling included renovating 5,600 square feet of the existing banquet hall into three classrooms, which are used for the Drama, Dance and Orchestra programs. The existing storefront glass and doors were replaced, a new awning canopy was added and the acoustical ceiling system and classroom carpets were replaced. The new drama room has the option to be converted into a black box theater when necessary.

OCSA has required school uniforms for its students since Osceola County implemented a uniform dress policy in 2009. In addition to the uniform policy implemented across the county, students may wear purple, navy blue, white or black collared shirts, but no school t-shirts or PE uniforms.

In honor of OCSA's eleventh anniversary, the school hosted a semi-formal gala event on August 15, 2013. The gala has been held every year since then, with the exception of 2020 due to the COVID-19 Pandemic.

Campus

Demographics 
The Osceola County School for the Arts is a minority-majority school. More than 50 percent of the school's population identifies as Hispanic, and female students outnumber male students by approximately 3 to 1.

As of the 2018–2019 school year, the ethnic makeup of OCSA is as follows:

Curriculum 

The Osceola County School for the Arts operates with 4x4 block scheduling. The school year (mid-August – early June) consists of two 18-week semesters, where each semester has three 90-minute class periods meeting every other day and one 50-minute class period meeting every day. The class schedule alternates between "ABABA" weeks and "BABAB" weeks, where "A" is "Purple" and "B" is "Teal," named after the school colors. Students attend classes Monday through Friday. The two classes following the lunch period on Wednesdays are shorter, after which students and faculty assemble for an hour-long recital open to the public that showcases students' artistic talents.

Prospective students must submit an application for admission, proper documentation, recent report card and FSA scores. The potential student will receive a letter in the mail letting them know when the audition for their particular major is. Auditions are held every semester for admission to the following semester. Each major has its own requirements for audition. Nonperformance majors require portfolios. An acceptance letter will be sent in the mail to the student if selected for attending The Osceola County School for the Arts in their desired area of study.

In addition to the regular middle school and high school curriculum, OCSA offers eight artistic programs for students to choose from: Visual Arts, Drama, Vocal Music, Instrumental Music/Band, Creative Writing, Dance, Orchestra, or Technical Theater (which consists of TV production, design and drafting (CAD), stagecraft, costume design and make-up, advanced carpentry, painting and props production, theater management, and stage lighting). Students in sixth, seventh, and eighth grades are restricted to Dance, Instrumental Music/Band or Orchestra. New and returning Instrumental Music/Band majors are required to attend summer band camp every year, and incoming sixth grade Orchestra majors are required to attend Strings Camp over the summer.

Although the school has sports clubs for students, it has no athletics program or mascot.

The Advanced Placement (AP) participation rate of juniors and seniors is 81 percent. The graduation rate as of the 2012–2013 school year is 100 percent. Post-high school plans for students are represented in the following chart:

Extracurricular activities 

The Osceola County School for the Arts offers various clubs, organizations and sports. Clubs includeNational Honor Society, Student Government Association, and Technology Student Association, some other notable clubs are Mu Alpha Theta (Math Club), Environmental Club, Fashion Club, Interact, Keyettes, Anime and Cosplay Club, Positiviti, Tri-M Music Honor Society and National Art Honor Society.

Awards and recognition 
The Osceola County School for the Arts has been rated an "A" school in the grading system that uses the Florida Comprehensive Assessment Test as its standard for eleven consecutive years. In 2011 and every consecutive year, the school has been ranked #228 out of 500 high schools in the United States and #16 out of 89 high schools in Florida. It has been awarded a gold medal by U.S. News & World Report, and was ranked #104 out of 2,081 high schools on the Washington Post{{}}s "America's Most Challenging High Schools." The Florida Department of Education awarded OCSA an "A" grade in December 2013 with prestigious Gold Medal status, due to the school's 100% graduation rate, FCAT testing results with math and reading proficiency, and college readiness during the 2012–2013 school year, making the Osceola County School for the Arts an "A" school for 10 years in a row.

Other accolades include the selection of the Osceola County School for the Arts Jazz Band "A" as 1 of 15 finalists in the 19th, 22nd, 23rd, and 27th Annual Essentially Ellington National High School Jazz Band competition in New York City."Osceola County School for the Arts" The Washington Post, June 1, 2013 It was ranked #778 out of 2,000 public high schools on The Daily Beast''s "America's Best High Schools."

The OCSA Class of 2019 dedicated a mass art mural as a legacy. The class of 2019 collected over $7.9 million dollars in scholarships from many colleges around the world.

Notable staff 

Donna Hart, former mayor of St. Cloud

Former principals 

2002–2007 Michael Vondracek
2007–2010 Jeanette Paul Rivers
2010–2013 Charles Mytron Lisby
2013–2015 Jonathan Rasmussen
2015–2020 Chundra Evens
2020–Present Dennis Neal

References

External links 
 
 The Ruminer online platform, "ReWORDgitate"

Osceola County Public Schools
Schools in Kissimmee, Florida
Magnet schools in Florida
Public middle schools in Florida
Public high schools in Florida
Art schools in Florida
Educational institutions established in 2002
2002 establishments in Florida